Goode Crossing is an unincorporated community in Powhatan County, in the U.S. state of Virginia.

This place is also known as Goodes Crossing.

References

Unincorporated communities in Virginia
Unincorporated communities in Powhatan County, Virginia